Conference USA Tournament or Conference USA Championship may refer to:

Conference USA Football Championship, the football championship game
Conference USA men's basketball tournament, the men's basketball championship tournament
Conference USA women's basketball tournament, the women's basketball championship tournament
Conference USA baseball tournament, the baseball championship tournament